Artic is an unincorporated community in DeKalb County, Indiana, in the United States. A historic variant spelling is Arctic.

History
A post office was established at Artic in 1845, and remained in operation until it was discontinued in 1903. It was likely named after the Arctic.

References

Unincorporated communities in DeKalb County, Indiana
Unincorporated communities in Indiana